Erwin Wagenhofer (born 27 May 1961, in Amstetten) is an Austrian author and film director.

In 1981 he presented his first short film Endstation normal. Two years later his short film Das Loch was shown at the Kraków Film Festival. From that year until 1987 he worked as a directing and camera assistant for several ORF productions as well as for movies and documentaries. Since 1987 he is a freelance author and film director. In 1988 he portrayed the artist Oswald Oberhuber in Das Fragmentarische in der Kunst.

From 1995 to 2000 he taught at Donauuniversität in Krems. Since 2002 he has been teaching at Universität für angewandte Kunst in Vienna. Since 2001 he completed several scripts for movies and documentaries.

In 2005 Wagenhofer directed the long documentary We Feed the World, produced by Allegro Film. It is about industrialization of food production and shows international agricultural politics from a critical viewpoint, especially with regards to the role of the EU. The film was seen by more than 800,000 people in Europe. It was shown at numerous festivals and won several prizes. In October 2008 his next documentary Let's Make Money was released in Germany and Austria. It is about money in a global financial system and unequal distribution of wealth.
He won the German Documentary Film Prize in 2009.

Filmography 

short films:
 1981: Endstation normal
 1982: Der stumme Frühling
 1983: Das Loch
 2001: Limes... Aktion Limes (documentary)
 2002: Moving Vienna (documentary)
 2002: Agnes ...

TV productions (selection):
 1988: Das Fragmentarische in der Kunst
 1990: Wettertanz
 1995: Chasing After The Molecule (documentary)
 1997: Off Screen
 1998: Menschen am Fluss (documentary)
 1999: Die vergorene Heimat
 1999: Daheim in Europa (documentary)
 2000: Der Gebrauch des Menschen
 2003: Operation Figurini (documentary)

cinema:
 2005: We Feed the World (documentary, 100 min)
 2008: Let's Make Money (documentary, 110 min)
 2011: Black Brown White (feature film, 106 min)
 2013: Alphabet (documentary, 113 min)
 2019: But Beautiful (documentary, 116 min)

Awards 
 Motovun Film Festival 2006
 FIPRESCI-Preis for We Feed the World
 Amnesty International Human Rights Award
 German Documentary Film Prize 2009

Notes and references

External links 

 
 

Austrian film directors
1961 births
German-language film directors
Living people